Enith Sijtje Maria Brigitha (born 15 April 1955) is a former leading competitive swimmer in the 1970s. She twice represented the Netherlands at the Summer Olympics, starting in 1972 (Munich, West Germany). She won two bronze medals at the 1976 Summer Olympics in Montreal, Quebec, Canada, in the women's 100 m and 200 m freestyle. Brigitha twice was named 'Dutch Sportswoman of the Year', in 1973 and 1974. She was the first black athlete to win a swimming medal in the Olympics.

East Germany doping controversy
In the 100m freestyle, Brigitha finished behind two swimmers from East Germany, a country proven to have engaged in systematic doping of its athletes in the Montreal 1976 Olympic games. As a result, other athletes have called for Brigitha to be officially awarded the gold in the 100m freestyle and silver in the 200m freestyle. Brigitha has said she considers herself a gold medal winner.

American Shirley Babashoff, who would have earned three individual golds were it not for the East Germans, has been outspoken about this issue. She supports Brigitha and swimmers from other countries who were adversely affected by the East German illegal practices.

References 

 Portrait of Enith Brigitha in the International Swimming Hall of Fame

1955 births
Living people
Dutch Antillean female swimmers
Swimmers at the 1972 Summer Olympics
Swimmers at the 1976 Summer Olympics
Olympic swimmers of the Netherlands
Olympic bronze medalists for the Netherlands
Dutch people of Curaçao descent
People from Willemstad
Olympic bronze medalists in swimming
Medalists at the 1976 Summer Olympics
Dutch female freestyle swimmers
Dutch female backstroke swimmers
World Aquatics Championships medalists in swimming
European Aquatics Championships medalists in swimming